The 1983–84 Morehead State Eagles men's basketball team represented Morehead State University during the 1983–84 NCAA Division I men's basketball season. The Eagles, led by head coach Wayne Martin, played their home games at Ellis Johnson Arena and are members of the Ohio Valley Conference. They finished the season 25–6, 12–2 in Ohio Valley play and were champions of the 1984 Ohio Valley Conference men's basketball tournament to earn an automatic bid in the NCAA tournament. As a 12 seed, they won the play-in game over North Carolina A&T before falling to No. 5 seed Louisville in the first round.

Roster

Schedule and results
 
|-
!colspan=9 style=| Regular season

|-
!colspan=9 style=| Ohio Valley Conference Basketball tournament

|-
!colspan=9 style=| NCAA tournament

References

Morehead State
Morehead State
Morehead State Eagles men's basketball seasons
Morehead State Eagles men's basketball, 1983-84
Morehead State Eagles men's basketball, 1983-84